The Missiquoi (or the Missisquoi or the Sokoki) were a historic band of Abenaki Indigenous peoples from present-day southern Quebec and formerly northern Vermont. This Algonquian-speaking group lived along the eastern shore of Lake Champlain at the time of the European incursion. Today, they are part of the Conseil des Abénakis d'Odanak, a First Nation in Quebec.

Missiquoi is also the name of a 17th-century Abenaki village in northern Vermont, for which the sub-tribe was named.

Name 
The name Missisquoi comes from mazipskoiak meaning "flint people," which comes from mazipskoik or "at the flint," meaning a chert quarry near what is now Swanton, Vermont. It's also spelled Missiassik or Masipskoik a word that means "where there are many big rocks or boulder" in Abenaki.

History 
Prior to European contact, some Western Abenaki founded villages at the mouth of the Missisquoi River. By the 17th century, Western Abenaki from across Lake Champlain consolidated into the main village at Missisquoi in northern Vermont, so historians began to use the term "Missisquoi tribe" for all Champlain Valley Abenakis.

The Sokoki people, who had lived along the Connecticut River, founded Odanak, also known as the village of St. Francis in Quebec. The Western Abenakis, including those living along the Merrimack River and the Champlain Valley, moved north to the Saint-François River in Quebec, Canada. There they joined the local Odanak community of Abenaki people. 

After enduring French and English colonists, the Missisquoi withdrew from areas of conflict during the American Revolutionary War. Linguist and historian Gordon M. Day wrote, "After this war, the Western Abenakis did not return to any of their former locations in force but rather united or reunited with their brethren at Saint Francis." Some held on to land claims in the United States and even collected rent. In 1805, the British Crown deeded lands near Durham, Quebec, to Abenaki people who fled the American Revolutionary War; these lands became the Durham Reserve. By 1850, this group became part of the large St. Francis village (Odanak).

State-recognized tribe 
The St. Francis-Sokoki Band of the Abenaki Nation of Missisquoi is state-recognized by Vermont and claim to be Missiquoi descendants. The group is based in Swanton, Vermont. 

The group applied for but was denied federal recognition as a Native American tribe in 2007. The summary of the proposed finding (PF) stated that "The SSA petitioner claims to have descended as a group mainly from a Western Abenaki Indian tribe, most specifically, the Missisquoi Indians" and went on to state: "However, the available evidence does not demonstrate that the petitioner or its claimed ancestors descended from the St. Francis Indians of Quebec, a Missiquoi Abenaki entity in Vermont, any other Western Abenaki group, or an Indian entity from New England or Canada. Instead, the PF concluded that the petitioner is a collection of individuals of claimed but undemonstrated Indian ancestry 'with little or no social or historical connection with each other before the early 1970's'...."

See also
Missisquoi River
Missisquoi County, Quebec
Missisquoi National Wildlife Refuge
Brome—Missisquoi, an electoral riding formerly known as Missisquoi
Brome-Missisquoi Regional County Municipality, Quebec
 Treaty of Watertown

Notes

References

Further reading 
 Waldman, Carl. Encyclopedia of Native American Tribes (New York: Checkmark Books, 2006) p. 1

External links 
 Counseil des Abénakis d'Odanak, official website
 Abenaki Nation of Missisquoi, Swanton, VT, a state-recognized tribe
 "An Act to enfranchise the Indians of the commonwealth." Federal status / Provincial status

Abenaki
Algonquian ethnonyms
First Nations in Quebec
Native American tribes in Vermont
Native American history of Vermont